The 1990 Salem Hong Kong Open was a men's tennis tournament played on outdoor hard courts on Hong Kong Island in Hong Kong that was part of the World Series of the 1990 ATP Tour. It was the 15th edition of the tournament and was held from 23 April through 29 April 1990. Unseeded Pat Cash, who entered the main draw on a wildcard, won the singles title. It was his first singles title since the 1987 South African Open and came almost a year after he ruptured his Achilles tendon.

Finals

Singles
 Pat Cash defeated  Alex Antonitsch 6–1, 6–3
 It was Cash's only singles title of the year and the 6th and last of his career.

Doubles
 Pat Cash /  Wally Masur defeated  Kevin Curren /  Joey Rive 6–3, 6–3
 It was Cash's 2nd and last doubles title of the year and the 10th of his career. It was Masur's 2nd and last doubles title of the year and the 11th of his career.

References

External links
 ITF tournament edition details

Salem Open
Hong Kong Open (tennis)
1990 in Hong Kong sport